Poor Little Rich Girls is a 1984 television sitcom which first aired on ITV in 1984. It portrays the lives of two financially-struggling cousins who attempt to rebuild their lives, following the loss of their husbands from divorce and widowhood. It starred Jill Bennett and Maria Aitken who co-created and scripted it together.

Actors who guest appeared in episodes of the series include Joan Sims, George A. Cooper, Sheila Keith, George Chakiris and Arthur Hewlett.

Main cast
 Maria Aitken as Kate Codd (8 episodes)
 Jill Bennett as Daisy Troop (8 episodes)
 Richard Walker as Dave Roberts (7 episodes)
 Lewis Fiander as Larry Codd (6 episodes)
 Joan Hickson as Lady Harriet (5 episodes)

References

Bibliography
 Howard Maxford. Hammer Complete: The Films, the Personnel, the Company. McFarland, 2018.

External links
 

ITV sitcoms
1984 British television series debuts
1984 British television series endings
1980s British comedy television series
English-language television shows
Television shows produced by Granada Television